Daniel Alarcón (born March 5, 1977 in Lima, Peru) is a Peruvian-American novelist, journalist and radio producer. He is co-founder, host and executive producer of Radio Ambulante, an award-winning Spanish language podcast distributed by NPR. Currently, he is an assistant professor of broadcast journalism at the Columbia University Journalism School and writes about Latin America for The New Yorker.

He began his career writing fiction, publishing stories in magazines like The New Yorker, Granta, Virginia Quarterly Review and elsewhere, and his short stories have been widely anthologized. He served as Associate Editor of the Peruvian magazine Etiqueta Negra until 2015. He is a former Fulbright Scholar to Peru, and a 2011 Artist in Residence at the Headlands Center for the Arts. His novel At Night We Walk in Circles was published by Riverhead Books in October 2013. His most recent story collection, The King is Always Above the People, was long-listed for the National Book Award in 2018, and won the 2019 Clarke Prize in Fiction. He received the MacArthur 'Genius Grant' in 2021.

Biography 
Alarcón, a native of Peru, was raised from the age of 3, in Birmingham, Alabama, and is an alumnus of Indian Springs School. As a high schooler, he attended the Telluride Association Summer Program. He earned a bachelor's degree in anthropology from Columbia University in 1999 and a master of fine arts degree in fiction from the Iowa Writers' Workshop in 2004. He has studied in Ghana and been a public school teacher in New York City. He was a high school classmate of novelist John Green.

His first book, War by Candlelight, was a finalist for the 2006 PEN/Hemingway Foundation Award. In 2008, he was awarded a Guggenheim Fellowship, a Lannan Fellowship, named a "Best Young American Novelist" by Granta magazine, and one of 39 under 39 Latin American Novelists. In 2010, he was also recognized by the New Yorker as one of 20 promising writers under 40.

Alarcón's debut novel, Lost City Radio, was published 2007, and has been translated into Spanish, Portuguese, French, German, Dutch, Greek, Italian, Serbian, Turkish, and Japanese. The German translation of Lost City Radio by Friedericke Meltendorf received the International Literature Award from the Haus der Kulturen der Welt. In 2009, he published a collection of short stories, El rey está siempre por encima del pueblo (The king is always above the people), and the following year, "Ciudad de payasos", a graphic novel adapted from his 2003 story City of Clowns, with illustrations by Peruvian artist Sheila Alvarado.

In 2011, he co-founded Radio Ambulante with his wife Carolina Guerrero, along with Camila Segura, Martina Castro and Annie Correal.

In 2013, his second novel, At Night We Walk in Circles, was published to critical acclaim.

Bibliography

Novels
 Lost City Radio (2007)
 At Night We Walk in Circles (Riverhead Books, 2013)

Short fiction 
Collections
 War by Candlelight: Stories (2005)
 The King Is Always Above the People
 El Rey siempre está por encima del pueblo Editorial Sexto Piso, Mexico City, Mexico, 2009
Anthologies (edited)
 Zoetrope All Story: The Latin American Issue. A compilation of stories by Latin American writers. Co-edited with Diego Trelles Paz. Spring 2009
Stories

 Lima, Peru, July 28, 1979, Virginia Quarterly Review 
 The King Is Always Above the People, Granta 

 The Provincials, Granta
 The Composer, Virginia Quarterly Review

Graphic novels
 City of Clowns. Illustrated by Sheila Alvarado. Riverhead Books. 2015. ISBN 978-1-59463-333-1. (Graphic novel adaptation of short story)

Non-fiction
 "What kind of Latino am I?". Salon. May 24, 2005.
 "Let's go, country: The new Latin left comes to Peru". Harper's. September 2006.
 "Lost in Translation". Granta. January 23, 2009.
 "The Inauguration". Granta. January 27, 2009.
 "Life Among the Pirates". Granta (109: Work). Winter 2009.
 
 "The Ground Floor". Granta (117: Horror). Autumn 2011. (Subscription Required)
 "A Peruvian Soccer Fan in Exile". The New Yorker. November 13, 2017

Awards
 Recipient of a Whiting Award in 2004 for fiction
 Recipient of a Guggenheim Fellowship 2007
 One of 21 Young American Novelists Granta, UK, 2007
 One of 39 under 39 Latino American Novelists (Hay Festival, Bogota, Colombia, 2007)
 One of 7 finalists for the Sargent Sr. First Novel Prize, Mercantile Library For Fiction, 2007
 Recipient of a Lannan Literary Fellowship in 2007
 One of 37 under 36 selected by the Smithsonian Magazine (Fall Special Issue, 2007) as Young American Innovators in the Arts and Sciences
 Lost City Radio has made the lists of best fiction for 2007 of The Washington Post, Booklist, The Christian Science Monitor, Chicago Tribune, Los Angeles Times and The Financial Times (London).
 Alabama Library Association Award for Fiction, Birmingham, Alabama, 2008
 2008 Pen USA award for Lost City Radio, Los Angeles, CA
 2009 International Literature Award – House of World Cultures (Berlin, Germany)
 The "Idiot President" has been selected for the best short stories and a narrative about describing his traveling in Palestine for the best travel stories. Both in 2009.
 The King Is Always Above the People, was chosen as one of three 2017 finalists for The Story Prize.
2021 MacArthur Fellowship

References

External links

 Daniel Alarcón website
 Profile at The Whiting Foundation
Daniel Alarcón recorded at the Library of Congress for the Hispanic Division's audio literary archive on May 9, 2014

Living people
1977 births
21st-century American male writers
21st-century American novelists
21st-century American short story writers
American male novelists
American male short story writers
Columbia College (New York) alumni
Hispanic and Latino American novelists
Indian Springs School alumni
Iowa Writers' Workshop alumni
The New Yorker people
Novelists from Alabama
PEN/Faulkner Award for Fiction winners
Peruvian emigrants to the United States
Writers from Birmingham, Alabama